The Party of the Cuban People – Orthodox (PPC-O), commonly shortened to the Orthodox Party, was a Cuban populist political party. It was founded in 1947 by Eduardo Chibás in response to government corruption and lack of reform. Its primary aims were the establishment of a distinct national identity, economic independence and the implementation of social reforms.

History
In the 1948 general elections Chibás came third in the presidential election, whilst the party won four seats in the House of Representatives. In the 1950 mid-term elections they won nine. Chibás' cousin, Roberto Agramonte, was the favorite to win the 1952 election (for the Ortodoxos) but Fulgencio Batista staged a coup almost three months before the election.

Fidel Castro was an active member of the PPC-O in the late 1940s and early 1950s. He intended to run as a PPC-O candidate for the Cuban parliament prior to the coup by Batista.

Ideology and platform
The PPC-O was a catch-all party, open to all that wanted join to it. Generally populist, there were not distinct internal factions or organizations, with all members united by their support of Eduardo Chibás' goals and ideals. The party's composition included several ideological groups ranging from the political centre to the left:
 Former members of the Authentic Party: staunch nationalists, supporting anti-imperialism and revolutionary goals
 Former members of the Popular Socialist Party: young socialists and communist soldiers, disappointed by their party's misconduct
 Former members of the Liberal Party of Cuba: petite bourgeoisie, with more pro-business views

The political program reflected PPC-O's catch-all nature, claiming support for:
 Direct democracy
 A multi-party political system
 The fight against political corruption, embezzlement and criminals
 Progressivism
 Anti-imperialism (mainly anti-Americanism) and nationalism
 Agrarian reform: Abolition of latifundios and monoculture, agricultural diversification
 Fair payments and economic redistribution
 Nationalization of railways, power plants, and telecommunications
 The free market and respect for private ownership
 Social corporatism and labor rights

The left-wing of the PPC-O had its most influence in the party's youth wing, the Orthodox Youth. A 1948 pamphlet by the Orthodox Youth espoused a Marxist-inspired, democratic socialist platform, but it was also critical of the Soviet-aligned Popular Socialist Party, which upheld Marxism–Leninism.

References

1947 establishments in Cuba
Anti-corruption parties
Cuban nationalism
Defunct political parties in Cuba
Political parties established in 1947
Socialist parties in Cuba